Sarecky is a surname. Notable persons with this name include:
Barney Sarecky (1895–1968), American film producer and screenwriter
Louis Sarecky (1886–1946), Russian-born American film producer and screenwriter, brother of Barney
Melody Sarecky, co-author of One Dad, Two Dads, Brown Dad, Blue Dads